La Manga Club Football Stadium is a stadium in La Manga Club, south of La Manga, Spain. It was a resort stadium and was used to friendly matches and as a resting and training place for the Spain national football team.

References

External links

Buildings and structures in Cartagena, Spain
Football venues in the Region of Murcia